The John Newcombe Women's Pro Challenge was a tournament for professional female tennis players played on outdoor hard courts. The event was classified as a $50,000 ITF Women's Circuit tournament and was held in New Braunfels, Texas, United States, from 2012 to 2014.

Past finals

Singles

Doubles

External links 
 ITF search

ITF Women's World Tennis Tour
Hard court tennis tournaments in the United States
Recurring sporting events established in 2012
Recurring sporting events disestablished in 2014
Tennis tournaments in Texas